Carenzia fastigiata is a species of extremely small deep water sea snail, a marine gastropod mollusk in the family Seguenziidae.

Description
The height of the shell attains 3.3 mm. it is broader than high with a width of 4.1 mm.

Distribution
This marine species occurs off New Zealand and in the Tasman Basin at a depth of about 1,700 m.

References

External links
 To Encyclopedia of Life
 To World Register of Marine Species

fastigiata
Gastropods described in 1983